Boreas is a peer-reviewed academic journal that has been published on behalf of the Collegium Boreas since 1972. The journal covers all branches of quaternary research, including biological and non-biological aspects of the quaternary environment in both glaciated and non-glaciated areas. Formerly published by Taylor & Francis, Boreas has been published by Wiley-Blackwell since 1998. According to the Journal Citation Reports, the journal has a 2012 impact factor of 2.457.

See also 
 List of earth and atmospheric sciences journals
 Journal of Quaternary Science

External links 
 

Ecology journals
Quaternary science journals
Wiley-Blackwell academic journals